This article provides a collection of the mottos of the provinces of the Dominican Republic.

References

Dominican Name Etymologies

Etymology
Provinces, Etymology